Part or all of these movies/shows either take place, or are set, in Houston, Texas or the surrounding area:

The Houston Story (1956) - starring Gene Barry and Barbara Hale (of Perry Mason)
Hellfighters (1968) - with John Wayne
Brewster McCloud (1970) – first film to be filmed inside the Astrodome
The Getaway (1972) – filmed in Huntsville, Texas
The Thief Who Came to Dinner (1973) – set and filmed in Houston
Sugar Hill (1974) - set and filmed in Houston
The Sugarland Express (1974) – filmed on location at the Texas Department of Criminal Justice – Inmate Division Jester III Unit in Sugar Land, Texas 
Together Brothers (1974) - filmed in Galveston, Texas
Rollerball (1975) – set in Houston but filmed in Bavaria, Germany
Futureworld (1976) – filmed at the Johnson Space Center facilities and Jones Hall
Logan's Run (1976) – filmed inside the Houston Hyatt Regency
The Bad News Bears in Breaking Training (1977) - filmed in the Astrodome as well as Bayland Park on 6400 Bissonnet
Murder at the World Series (1977) – made-for-TV film
Telefon (1977) – set in Houston but filmed on a Hollywood backlot, parts of Los Angeles and inside the Hyatt Regency at 5 Embarcadero in San Francisco
FM (1978) – filmed at Greenway Plaza in Houston
The Swarm (1978) - second unit scenes filmed on Memorial Drive, Astrodome, Interstate 45 South/McKinney Street Exit ramp, and the main lobby of 2 Houston Center
Texas (1980–1982) – daytime soap opera, a spin-off of Another World
Urban Cowboy (1980) - Filmed at the old Gilley's in Pasadena, Texas. 
Murder in Texas (1981) – made-for-TV film
Student Bodies (1981)
The Best Little Whorehouse in Texas (1982) – character played by Dom DeLuise was based on KTRK-TV personality Marvin Zindler
Terms of Endearment (1982)
Airplane II: The Sequel (1982)
Adam (1983) - set in Hollywood, Florida, filmed in and around Houston. Based on the 1981 disappearance and murder of Adam Walsh.
Local Hero (1983) - filmed in Houston and Scotland
 The Man Who Loved Women (1983 film) - Blake Edwards movie filmed in Houston. 
Uncommon Valor  (1983) – set in Houston, filmed in California
Blood Simple (1984) 
Cutter to Houston (1984)
Paris, Texas (1984) – shot in several cities around Texas, including Houston
The Trip to Bountiful (1984) – set in Houston but filmed in Dallas
Pray for Death (1985) - set and filmed in Houston
Buck James (1987–1988) – based on Dr. Red Duke
Houston Knights (1987–1988)
My Best Friend Is a Vampire (1988)
Twins (1988) – sale of engine set in Houston
A Tiger's Tale (1988) – Rose's house was in League City
Full Moon in Blue Water (1988) – Filmed in Seabrook
Blind Fury (1989) – filmed partially in Houston
Cohen and Tate (1989) - Highway portion filmed along Memorial Drive near Allen Parkway
For All Mankind (1989) – documentary filmed partially in Houston
Leningrad Cowboys Go America (1989)
Night Game (1989) – filmed in Galveston
Akkare Akkare Akkare (1990) – Malayalam movie filmed in Houston
I Come in Peace (1990)
RoboCop 2 (1990) - set in Detroit, but chiefly filmed in Houston
Rush (1991) – filmed in Houston as well as at The Swinging Door BBQ in Richmond, Texas.
City of Joy (1992) – first scene is set in Houston
Sidekicks (1992)
A Taste for Killing (1992) – made-for-TV film
Wild Wheels (1992) - documentary footage dating back to the late 1980s during the Houston Art Car Parade including artist interviews are seen in the film - some parade footage dates back to 1988 when the parade was co-branded with the Houston International Festival
A Perfect World (1993) – filmed in Huntsville
The Chase (1994) – filmed in the Rice Village area and several highways around the Houston area; one scene also shot in Kemah
City of Joy (1994) - set in Houston, though not filmed there
Jason's Lyric (1994) - set in Houston's Third, Fourth, and Fifth Ward including a scene at This Is It! Soul Food Restaurant, a local Houston eatery
Reality Bites (1994)
Thea (1994)
Apollo 13 (1995) Johnson Space Center (box office #1 film in U.S.)
Powder (1995) - filmed in Sugar Land, a Houston suburb, and some indoor scenes on a soundstage at Houston Studios in Downtown Houston
Don't Look Back (1996) – filmed in Galveston, Texas
The Evening Star (1996) - sequel to Terms of Endearment (1982)
Independence Day (1996) – Houston is largely destroyed by a nuclear missile
SubUrbia (1996) – filmed in Houston, Set in Austin, Texas
Tin Cup (1996) – final tournament shot in Kingwood, Texas
Prithvi (1997) - set in Houston, Texas
Selena (1997) – Selena's final concert scene is set in the Astrodome, but filmed in San Antonio, Texas
Armageddon (1998) – filmed at the Johnson Space Center facilities
Dance With Me (1998)
Fifth Ward (1998) – filmed in and set in Houston's Fifth Ward
Rushmore (1998) – written and directed by Houstonian Wes Anderson; filmed at his alma mater, St. John's School, as well as The Kinkaid School
Arlington Road (1999) – filmed in Pearland, a Houston suburb, and at the University of Houston
Mercy (2000)
Space Cowboys (2000)
Reba (2001-2007) – TV series set in Houston but filmed in Los Angeles
Pearl Harbor (2001) - San Jacinto Battlefield State Memorial Site
Texas Justice (2001-) – filmed in Houston
Houston Medical (2002)
Tarnation (2002) - contains old pictures from Houston
Animal Cops: Houston (2003-2015)
The Crooked E: The Unshredded Truth About Enron (2003) – set in Houston, but filmed in Canada
Right on Track (2003) – Disney Channel movie set in Houston, but filmed in Utah
Where's the Party Yaar? (2003) - also called Dude, Where's the Party; filmed entirely in Houston, about a nerdy Indian student who visits his hip nephew in Houston
Friday Night Lights (2004) - in the book and real life events, the final game of the Permian High School Team is played at The University of Texas at Austin in Austin not the Astrodome of Houston
Suburban Madness (2004) - details the Clara Harris story
14 Hours (2005) – made-for-TV film set in Houston, but filmed in Canada
Enron: The Smartest Guys in the Room (2005) – documentary about the Enron scandal
Volver (2006) – Houston is mentioned briefly several times by a woman with cancer as a place where "they cure everything there"
Fast Food Nation (2006)  – filmed in several US cities, including Houston
American Drug War: The Last White Hope (2007) – documentary with scenes in Houston
Towelhead (2007) – set in a Houston suburb, but filmed in Los Angeles
Crazy Heart (2009) - partly filmed in downtown Houston
I Love You Phillip Morris (2009) - Set in and around this Houston area with references to Houston locations such as the Gulf Freeway and the Montrose District in Harris County. The real crimes of Steven Jay Russell mostly took place in Dallas. Filming happened in Miami, Los Angeles, and Louisiana
Mao's Last Dancer (2009) - drama about the life of ballet dancer Li Cunxin; partly filmed in Houston at the China Garden Restaurant and JP Morgan Chase Tower downtown, Miller Outdoor Theatre in Hermann Park, and the Wortham Theater Center downtown; mostly filmed in Australia and Nanjing, China
The Open Road (2009)
Puncture (2011)
Transformers: Dark of the Moon (2011) (box office #1 film in U.S.)
Tree of Life (2011) – shot in Houston and other cities in Texas; starring Sean Penn and Brad Pitt
My 600-lb Life - Filming is done at Dr. Younan Nowzaradan's office located at 4009 Bellaire Blvd. in Southside Place (Houston)
Boyhood (2014) – directed by Richard Linklater; shot in Houston, Austin, San Marcos, Big Bend National Park, and other locations in Texas
Draft Day (2014)
Top Five (2014)
God's Not Dead (2014) - filmed in Baton Rouge, set in Houston 
The Martian (2015) (box office #1 film in the U.S.)
 10 Cloverfield Lane (2016) sign that leads to Houston in the end of the movie
 Billion Dollar Buyer (2016-2018)
Look Mom I Can Fly (2018)
 Red Rocket (2021)
 X (2022) begins in Houston
 Top Chef: Houston (2022)
 Apollo 10 1⁄2: A Space Age Childhood (2022) Set in Houston and the suburb of Clear Lake, featuring Johnson Space Center and Rice University.

References

External links
 Internet Movie Database – Titles with locations including Houston, Texas, USA

 
Culture of Houston
Houston-related lists